Daniel O'Kearney (died 1778) was an Irish prelate who served in the Roman Catholic Church as the Bishop of Limerick from 1759 to 1778.

He was appointed the Bishop of the Roman Catholic Diocese of Limerick by a papal brief on 27 November 1759 and consecrated on 27 January 1760.

He died in office on 24 January 1778.

References 

 
 
 
 
 

1778 deaths
18th-century Roman Catholic bishops in Ireland
Roman Catholic bishops of Limerick
Year of birth unknown